The Masoumeh and Fereydoon Soudavar Professorship of Persian Studies is a Chair at the University of Oxford, England, associated with the Faculty of Oriental Studies and Wadham College. The Chair was inaugurated in 1990.

List of Soudavar Professors of Persian Studies

The holders of the Chair have been:

Reza Sheikholeslami, 1990–2006
Edmund Herzig, 2006–

References

 

Professorships at the University of Oxford
Cultural studies
Wadham College, Oxford
Lists of people associated with the University of Oxford